Sharon Jones (born 24 April 1964) is a British former competitive ice dancer. With partner Paul Askham, she is the 1985–1988 British national champion. They represented Great Britain at the 1988 Winter Olympics, where they placed 13th.

Jones married Stephen (Steve) Baker, a former pair skater who competed at the 1976 World Junior Championships. Their son, Jean-Luc, is the 2014 World Junior ice dancing champion competing with Kaitlin Hawayek for the United States. The couple work as coaches in Seattle. They coached their son during his earlier partnership with Joylyn Yang.

Competitive highlights
(with Askham)

References

 

English female ice dancers
Living people
1964 births
Sportspeople from Manchester
Olympic figure skaters of Great Britain
Figure skaters at the 1988 Winter Olympics
English emigrants to the United States